"Mamacita" is a song by American singer Jason Derulo, featuring vocals from Puerto Rican singer and songwriter Farruko. It was released as a single on July 5, 2019, by Warner Records. The song was written by Carlos Efrén Reyes Rosado, Danny Ocean, Edwin Serrano, Jason Desrouleaux, Matt Zara, Nick Gale and Shawn Charles.

Background
In a previous interview with Billboard, Derulo said, "I wanted to make a party song that had a Latin feel, when I got Farruko’s verse I felt like it was going to be fire."

Music video
A music video to accompany the release of "Mamacita" was first released onto YouTube on July 18, 2019. Derulo directed the music video, which was filmed in Miami and Los Angeles.

Track listing

Personnel
Credits adapted from The Weeknd's official website and Tidal.

 Digital Farm Animals – Producer
 Jason Derulo – Additional Production, Writer
 Lil Eddie – Background Vocals, Production
 Yung Raf – Background Vocals
 Matt Zara – Co-Producer, Writer
 Chris Gehringer – Masterer
 Manny Marroquin – Mixer
 Farruko – Vocals, Writer
 Danny Ocean – Writer
 Edwin Serrano – Writer
 Nick Gale – Writer
 Shawn Charles – Writer

Charts

Release history

References

2019 songs
2019 singles
Jason Derulo songs
Songs written by Digital Farm Animals
Songs written by Jason Derulo
Songs written by Lil' Eddie
Song recordings produced by Digital Farm Animals
Farruko songs